High side or highside can refer to:

 An air-gapped computer network
 Highsider, a type of motorcycle accident